Pouteria rufotomentosa is a species of plant in the family Sapotaceae. It is endemic to Guatemala.

References

Endemic flora of Guatemala
rufotomentosa
Vulnerable plants
Taxonomy articles created by Polbot